Scott Dale (born 29 May 1994 from Blackpool) is a former professional English darts player who plays in Professional Darts Corporation events.

Career
From Blackpool, Dale made his European Tour Debut losing to Raymond van Barneveld on the 2016 PDC European Darts Grand Prix.

Dale Quit the PDC in January 2019.

References

External links
Profile and stats on Darts Database

1994 births
Living people
English darts players
People from Blackpool